Moskovskaya zastava Municipal Okrug is a municipal okrug in Moskovsky District, one of the eighty-one low-level municipal divisions  of the federal city of St. Petersburg, Russia. As of the 2010 Census, its population was 45,680, down from 46,951 recorded during the 2002 Census.

It was formerly known as Municipal Okrug #44.

References

Notes

Sources

Moskovsky District, Saint Petersburg